Louis-Frédéric Lescure (27 May 1904 – 5 December 1993) was a French industrialist, and the CEO of Groupe SEB from 1953 to 1972.

Early life
Lescure was born on 27 May 1904.

Career
Lescure was the CEO of Groupe SEB from 1953 to 1972.

In the 1950s, Lescure launched the Cocotte-Minute, the first one-piece stamped aluminium pressure cooker.

Lescure was president of the regional council of Bourgogne from 1983 to 1985.

Personal life, death and legacy
Lescure married Françoise Helie, and they had eleven children.

Lescure died on 5 December 1993, aged 89. His son Emmanuel Lescure later became chairman of Groupe SEB.

References

1904 births
1993 deaths
French industrialists
French chief executives
Louis-Frederic